James Roy McPherson (February 20, 1931 – April 23, 2011) was a Canadian football player who played for the Winnipeg Blue Bombers.

References

1931 births
2011 deaths
Canadian football people from Winnipeg
Players of Canadian football from Manitoba
Winnipeg Blue Bombers players